Lion van Minden (10 June 1880 – 6 September 1944) was a Dutch Olympic epee fencer, who was killed in the Auschwitz concentration camp.

Early life
Van Minden was born in Amsterdam, The Netherlands, and was Jewish.  He was the son of Abraham Lion van Minden (1850-1915) and Branca Ziekenoppasser (1855-1943), and the husband of Esther Mina Schlossberg (1893-1945).

Fencing career
His fencing club was Koninklijke Officiers Schermbond, in Den Haag.

Van Minden competed in saber in the 1908 Summer Olympics in London, England, at 27 years of age.  He won two bouts, and lost three.

Killing
Van Minden was killed in the Auschwitz concentration camp in 1944.

References

1880 births
1944 deaths
Dutch male épée fencers
Dutch people who died in Auschwitz concentration camp
Jewish male épée fencers
Jewish Dutch sportspeople
Fencers at the 1908 Summer Olympics
Olympic fencers of the Netherlands
Dutch Jews who died in the Holocaust
Fencers from Amsterdam
Dutch civilians killed in World War II
Dutch male foil fencers
Jewish male foil fencers